Sándor Kuti (1908–1945?) was a Hungarian Jewish composer. His "Serenade for string trio" and a solo violin sonata are featured on the 2008 Hungaroton album In Memoriam: Hungarian Composers, Victims Of The Holocaust.

References

1908 births
1945 deaths
20th-century composers
Hungarian Jews who died in the Holocaust
20th-century Hungarian male musicians
Hungarian Jewish musicians
Hungarian World War II forced labourers